Arvin Slagter (born 19 September 1985) is a Dutch basketball player who plays for the Netherlands men's national 3x3 team.

Slagter also played for several other Dutch 5vs5 teams in his career, including Rotterdam, Bergen op Zoom, Leiden and Groningen. Slagter usually plays the point guard or shooting guard position and is also a member of the Dutch national basketball team since 2006. He is currently a member of the 3X3 Dutch National Team. Slagter is the all-time leader in assists (1,614) in the Dutch Basketball League.

Career

Rotterdam (2003–2007)
Slagter played his first seasons for Rotterdam Basketbal. In 2006 he was named the MVP under 23.

West-Brabant Giants (2007–2010)
Slagter left Rotterdam in 2007 for WCAA Giants in Bergen op Zoom. In 2010 he reached the DBL Finals with the Giants.

ZZ Leiden (2010–2013)
After the 2009–10 season Slagter went to Leiden to play for Zorg en Zekerheid Leiden. In three seasons with Leiden he won the DBL twice, the Dutch Supercup twice and the NBB Cup once.

GasTerra Flames (2013–2014)
Slagter left the defending champion Leiden and signed with GasTerra Flames (formerly Donar) from Groningen for the 2013–14 season. He won the NBB Cup with the Flames and got the top seed in the DBL. Slagter averaged 8.8 points and 4.4 assists in 24.6 minutes per game in the DBL regular season. He also was the league leader in three point percentage, as he was shooting .500 from behind the arc. On April 21, 2014 Slagter was named the best player in the Netherlands, by receiving the DBL Most Valuable Player Award. Slagter was the first Dutch MVP since Peter van Paassen in 2009.

After the Playoffs, in which Flames beat Amsterdam, Leiden and Den Bosch Slagter was named Playoffs MVP. He averaged 8.9 points, 3.1 rebounds and 2.8 assists in 14 playoff games.

Den Bosch (2014–2016)
On 8 July 2014, Slagter signed a 2-year contract with SPM Shoeters Den Bosch.

Donar (2016–2019)
On 8 July 2016, Slagter signed a 1-year contract with Donar, which he previously played for in the 2013–14 season, when the team was named "GasTerra Flames". In the 2016–17 season, Slagter was named DBL Sixth Man of the Year. In April 2017, Slagter extended his contract with 2 more years.

In the 2017–18 season, Slagter won his second Sixth Man of the Year Award.

3x3 basketball
In 2020, Slagter started playing 3x3 basketball with the 3X3 Team Amsterdam and the Netherlands national 3x3 team. He helped the team qualify and played at the 2020 Summer Olympics in Tokyo, where the team finished in the fifth place.

International career

On 24 August 2006, Slagter made his debut for the Netherlands national basketball team in a game against Iceland. He played at EuroBasket 2015, and averaged 4.4 points and 2.6 assists per game.

Slagter played in 132 games for the Netherlands and scored a total of 973 points, good for an average of 7.4 points per game.

Honors

Club
Dutch Basketball League (5): 
2010–11, 2012–13, 2013–14, 2014–15, 2016–17
Dutch Cup (5): 
2011–12, 2013–14, 2015–16, 2016–17, 2017–18
Dutch Supercups (4):
2011, 2012, 2015, 2016

Individual awards
DBL Most Valuable Player: 2014
DBL Playoffs MVP: 2014
DBL All-Star Team: 2014
DBL MVP Under 23: 2006, 2008
DBL All-Star: 2007, 2010, 2013, 2014
DBL All-Defense Team: 2014

Player profile
Slagter is known as a three-point specialist with a high basketball IQ and excellent court vision. He is also praised for his leadership capability in the Netherlands, as he was part of championship teams with different clubs in the DBL.

Personal
Slagter is the son of a Dutch father and a Surinamese mother. His younger brother, Gian, also played professional basketball for Apollo Amsterdam and Rotterdam. His sister, Zoë, plays professionally for the Den Helder Suns.

References

External links

1985 births
Living people
Dutch Basketball League players
Dutch men's basketball players
Point guards
Feyenoord Basketball players
Shooting guards
Heroes Den Bosch players
Basketball players from Amsterdam
West-Brabant Giants players
B.S. Leiden players
Donar (basketball club) players
3x3 basketball players at the 2020 Summer Olympics
Olympic 3x3 basketball players of the Netherlands